Ballysheil is a townland of 385 acres in County Down, Northern Ireland. It is situated in the civil parish of Annaclone and the historic barony of Iveagh Upper, Upper Half.

The area was church land in the 17th century, held along with Aughnacloy, County Down, by the O’Sheil (Ó Siadhail) family. Although they forfeited the lands in 1658, the townland name continued to include their surname.

References

Townlands of County Down
Civil parish of Annaclone